Joshua Oghene-Ochuko Akpudje (born 23 July 1998) is a Nigerian professional footballer who plays for FK Jablonec as a centre-back.

Career
Born in Lagos, Joshua Akpudje started his football career with Femmak Football Academy straight out of high school before joining Nigerian Professional Football League side MFM ahead of the abridged season in 2019.

On 3 March 2020, Akpudje completed a transfer to Latvian club BFC Daugavpils

After playing for two seasons in Latvia, Joshua moved to Lithuanian side, FK Panevėžys in February 2022.

He made his international debut for Nigeria U23 side in March 2019 against Libya  in an Africa U-23 Cup of Nations qualification game.

References

1998 births
Living people
Nigerian footballers
Association football defenders
BFC Daugavpils players
FK Jablonec players
Expatriate footballers in the Czech Republic
Expatriate footballers in Latvia
Expatriate footballers in Lithuania
FK Panevėžys players
Nigerian expatriate sportspeople in the Czech Republic
Nigerian expatriate sportspeople in Latvia
Nigerian expatriate sportspeople in Lithuania
Latvian Higher League players
A Lyga players
Nigeria Professional Football League players
MFM F.C. players